Berra is a comune (municipality) in the Province of Ferrara, Emilia-Romagna, Italy.

Berra may also refer to:

 Berra (surname)
 La Berra, a mountain of the Alps, Switzerland

See also 
 Bera (disambiguation)